Prince Moulay Idriss El Alaoui (born c. 1963) is an Alaouite dynasty prince. In addition to being an ex special advisor to king Mohammed VI, he is a businessman. He lives in Meknes, Morocco.

Family
He is the son of Prince Moulay Hassan ben Driss and his wife Princess Lalla Amina bint Moulay Yusef. He has a son named Moulay Youssef El Alaoui.

Business 
Most of his business activities are in real-estate and agriculture.

Entered the Moroccan Diplomatic Service and served as Counsellor to Gabon and to Libya without moving anytime his country. He is also a Special Adviser to King Mohammed VI. His wealth is estimated at $2.3 billion.

Honours
 Knight Grand Cross of the Order of Merit of the Italian Republic (Italy, 11 April 2000)
 Knight Grand Cross of the Order of Civil Merit (Spain, 16 September 2000)

References

1963 births
Living people
Advisors of Mohammed VI of Morocco
Ambassadors of Morocco to Libya
Ambassadors of Morocco to Gabon
Moroccan businesspeople
Moroccan princes
People from Rabat
Grand Cross of the Order of Civil Merit
Knights Grand Cross of the Order of Merit of the Italian Republic